A mammal is a vertebrate animal with milk-producing glands.

Mammal, Mammals or Mammalia may also refer to:

Music 
 Mammal (band), an Australian rock/metal group
 Mammal (EP), their debut EP
 The Mammals, an American folk rock band
 Mammal (album), by Irish metal band Altar of Plagues
 "Mammal", a song on Apollo 18 (album) by They Might Be Giants
 Mammalia, Comparative Anatomy's debut album

Other media 
 Mammal (film), a 2016 Irish film
 Mammals (play), by Amelia Bullmore
 Mammals (TV series), a 2022 British Amazon-produced comedy